Harry Sherburn Patten (August 9, 1860 – June 5, 1931) was an American lawyer and politician from New York.

Life 
Patten was born on August 9, 1860 in Tyrone, New York. He attended the Utica Free Academy. He worked as a farmer for a time.

In 1884, after studying law in the law office of W. and N. E. Kernan, Patten passed the bar. From 1885 to 1888 he worked as clerk of the city court of Utica. He later established his own law office. He was a member of Whitestown Board of Health and Commissioner of the U.S. Deposit Fund of Oneida County. He lived in Whitesboro. He was also head of the Whitestown Water Works Company.

In 1891, Patten was elected to the New York State Assembly as a Democrat, representing the Oneida County 2nd District. He served in the Assembly in 1892. After his term in the Assembly, he was appointed Oneida County loan commissioner.

In 1880, Patten married Effie L. Combs of Utica. Their children were Elizabeth, Mrs. W. F. Waterbury, Mrs. C. W. Clarke, Mrs. H. B. Boyle.

Patten died at home on June 5, 1931.

References

External links 
The Political Graveyard

1860 births
1931 deaths
People from Schuyler County, New York
New York (state) lawyers
People from Whitesboro, New York
19th-century American politicians
Democratic Party members of the New York State Assembly